Arthur Leonard Cumberlidge (5 April 1914 – 20 April 1983) was an English footballer who played at left-half for Port Vale and coached Northwich Victoria.

Career
Cumberlidge played for Stoke City, before joining Port Vale as an amateur in October 1936. He made his debut in February 1937, and signed professional forms the following month. He made eight Third Division North appearances in the 1936–37 season, and played 23 league games in the 1937–38 season. He featured 35 times in the Third Division South in the 1938–39 campaign. He converted to left-half for the 1939–40 season, having previously been used as a left-back and inside-forward. After the conclusion of World War II, he was out of favour and barely played before he was transferred to Northwich Victoria. He managed the "Vics" in the Cheshire County League in 1968.

Career statistics
Source:

References

People from Wolstanton
English footballers
Association football midfielders
Stoke City F.C. players
Port Vale F.C. players
Northwich Victoria F.C. players
English Football League players
English football managers
Northwich Victoria F.C. managers
1914 births
1983 deaths